The Masonic Temple is a historic Masonic Lodge and office building located at Shelby, Cleveland County, North Carolina.  It was built in 1924–1925, and is a four-story, rectangular, brushed brick building.  It is in the Egyptian Revival style with massive concrete lintels at the first story, robust lotiform pillars at the building's principal entrance, and a richly ornamented cornice frieze.  It was commissioned by the Cleveland Lodge of the Ancient, Free, and Accepted Masons of North Carolina. Today, no Masonic lodges meet in the building.

It was listed on the National Register of Historic Places in 1982. It is located in the Central Shelby Historic District.

References

Clubhouses on the National Register of Historic Places in North Carolina
Office buildings on the National Register of Historic Places in North Carolina
Egyptian Revival architecture in the United States
Masonic buildings completed in 1925
Buildings and structures in Cleveland County, North Carolina
Former Masonic buildings in North Carolina
National Register of Historic Places in Cleveland County, North Carolina
Historic district contributing properties in North Carolina